Opprobrium may refer to:

 Opprobrium, disgrace arising from exceedingly shameful conduct (see shame)
 Opprobrium (band), a death metal band from Louisiana founded in 1986

et:opprobrium
fr:opprobrium
io:opprobrium
it:opprobrium
kn:opprobrium
my:opprobrium
nl:opprobrium
pl:opprobrium
ru:opprobrium
te:opprobrium
vi:opprobrium
zh:opprobrium